Arco is a city in Lincoln County, Minnesota, United States. The population was 75 at the 2010 census.

History
Arco was platted in 1900, and named after Arcola, in Italy. A post office has been in operation at Arco since 1900.

Geography

Demographics

2010 census
As of the census of 2010, there were 75 people, 37 households, and 18 families residing in the city. The racial makeup of the city was 92.0% White and 8.0% from other races.

There were 37 households, of which 16.2% had children under the age of 18 living with them, 37.8% were married couples living together, 8.1% had a female householder with no husband present, 2.7% had a male householder with no wife present, and 51.4% were non-families. 45.9% of all households were made up of individuals, and 29.7% had someone living alone who was 65 years of age or older. The average household size was 2.03 and the average family size was 2.89.

The median age in the city was 49.5 years. 16% of residents were under the age of 18; 12% were between the ages of 18 and 24; 13.4% were from 25 to 44; 33.3% were from 45 to 64; and 25.3% were 65 years of age or older. The gender makeup of the city was 49.3% male and 50.7% female.

2000 census
As of the census of 2000, there were 100 people, 44 households, and 28 families residing in the city. The racial makeup of the city was 98.00% White, 1.00% Native American, and 1.00% from two or more races.

There were 44 households, out of which 31.8% had children under the age of 18 living with them, 54.5% were married couples living together, 6.8% had a female householder with no husband present, and 34.1% were non-families. 31.8% of all households were made up of individuals, and 15.9% had someone living alone who was 65 years of age or older. The average household size was 2.27 and the average family size was 2.86.

In the city, the population was spread out, with 20.0% under the age of 18, 12.0% from 18 to 24, 27.0% from 25 to 44, 18.0% from 45 to 64, and 23.0% who were 65 years of age or older. The median age was 38 years. For every 100 females, there were 104.1 males. For every 100 females age 18 and over, there were 122.2 males.

The median income for a household in the city was $30,625, and the median income for a family was $31,875. Males had a median income of $21,875 versus $20,833 for females. The per capita income for the city was $13,479. There were 6.9% of families and 4.9% of the population living below the poverty line, including no under eighteens and 6.9% of those over 64.

References

Cities in Minnesota
Cities in Lincoln County, Minnesota
Populated places established in 1900
1900 establishments in Minnesota